Brian Willison (born May 6, 1977) is owner and senior IT consultant at B. Willison & Associates. He is the former Executive Director of the Parsons Institute for Information Mapping (PIIM) at The New School and Program Management Officer at World Health Organization.

Biography

Early life
Brian Willison was born in Moorestown, New Jersey. He attended the Moorestown Friends School (Moorestown, New Jersey) in its Lower and Middle school programs. After transferring, Willison graduated from The Lawrenceville School (Lawrenceville, New Jersey) in 1995. He attended Washington University in St. Louis where he graduated with a bachelor's degree in fine arts and engineering in 1999. Willison received his master's degree from the Parsons School of Design in 2005.  In 2012, he received an ExEd degree from MIT Sloan School of Management.

Career
Willison has worked in the fields of new media, publishing, marketing, and software development for companies located in St. Louis, Missouri, Philadelphia, Pennsylvania, San Francisco, California, and New York, New York. During the economic retraction following the Dot-com era, Willison launched a successful technology consulting practice which developed technologies for Charles Schwab, Microsoft, Ebay.com, and AT&T.

, Willison is the Executive Director of the Parsons Institute for Information Mapping (PIIM) at The New School where he oversees PIIM's engagements in commercial and academic pursuits in the fields of knowledge visualization, information design, software development, Geographic Information Systems (GIS), and Electronic Medical Record (EMR) systems.

At the Parsons Institute for Information Mapping (PIIM), Willison has led technology programs for United States Government initiatives:

 Geospace and Media Tool (GMT) for the United States Congress
 Modular Integrated Knowledge System (MIKS) for the National Geospatial-Intelligence Agency
 Media File Generator (MFG) for the Department of Defense
 Human Organizational Network Generator (HONG) for the Department of Defense
 Georeferenced Information Visualization (GIV) for the Department of Defense
 Armed Forces Health Longitudinal Technology Application (AHLTA) Graphic User Interface redesign for the Department of Defense, Military Health System, and United States Army Medical Research and Materiel Command
 Visual Dashboard and Heads-Up Display of Patient Conditions for the Department of Defense, Military Health System, and United States Army Medical Research and Materiel Command

From 2011 to 2013 Mr. Willison worked at The Global Fund overseeing technology and implementation programs for the organization's financial disbursement review cycles with mechanisms attached to the various country programs in the fields of Aids, Malaria, and Tuberculosis.

From 2013 to 2014 Mr. Willison worked at the World Health Organization establishing the WHO ICT Global Governance framework. His work was implemented across all WHO ICT offices (HQ, Regional and Local Offices) in all countries served by the World Health Organization.

From 2014 Mr. Willison has managed his consulting firm B. Willison & Associates. The firm's primary areas of focus were Information Technology, E-Commerce, Cloud Computing and Organizational Governance. Mr. Willison introduced specialized practices in crypto-financing, blockchain development and was an early adopter of blockchain and Bitcoin in Swiss cryptocurrency circles.

Publications
 Iterative Milestone Engineering Model
 Visualization Driven Rapid Prototyping
 Advancing Meaningful Use: Simplifying Complex Clinical Metrics Through Visual Representation

References
http://piim.newschool.edu/about/message-from-the-director
https://web.archive.org/web/20110612095707/http://www.thevillager.com/villager_39/mccainandkerrey.html
https://web.archive.org/web/20091004232932/http://www.carmengroup.com/education/case-histories

External links
 http://www.who.int
 http://www.theglobalfund.org
 http://www.wustl.edu
 https://web.archive.org/web/20091202033003/http://www.parsons.edu/

The New School faculty
Living people
Moorestown Friends School alumni
1977 births
Washington University in St. Louis alumni
Parsons School of Design alumni
Sam Fox School of Design & Visual Arts alumni
McKelvey School of Engineering alumni
MIT Sloan School of Management alumni